Thompson Spur is a large, rugged mountain spur that descends eastward from Daniels Range between the Swanson Glacier and Edwards Glacier, in the Usarp Mountains. Mapped by United States Geological Survey (USGS) from surveys and U.S. Navy air photos, 1960–63. Named by Advisory Committee on Antarctic Names (US-ACAN) for David H. Thompson, United States Antarctic Research Program (USARP) biologist at Hallett Station, 1965–66 and 1967–68.

See also
Fruitcake Bluff

Ridges of Victoria Land
Pennell Coast
Mountain spurs